Makar Sergeyevich Shevtsov (born 9 January 1980 in Maykop) is a former Russian football player.

References

1980 births
People from Maykop
Living people
Russian footballers
FC Elista players
Russian Premier League players
Association football forwards
Sportspeople from Adygea